Gjilan has been the birthplace or a significant home to numerous famous individuals. Additionally, many "Gjilanas" have become worthy of note through their various charitable activities, donations and contributions.
The following list contains persons of note who were born, raised, or spent portions of their lives in Gjilan.

Agim Ramadani 

Agim Ramadani (3 May 1964 – April 1999) was an Albanian leader of the Kosovo Liberation Army. He was born in Zhegër of Gjilan. During the war he was a soldier that contributed for freedom in Kosovo. He lived in Prizren, while he was working in Germany. During the war he proved that he was a senior strategist and a good leader for soldiers. It was one of the drafters of the plan for breaking Albanian border, which was something that he accomplished with his peers. He was the first one to pull the stone-pyramid-border Koshare. His conspiracy-name was Katana. He was also qualified as one of the most famous heroes of recent history. Ramadani left behind three descendants, two boys and a girl.

Rexhep Malaj 

Rexhep Malaj is considered a national symbol of resistance and a hero of the nation. He was born on March 29, 1951 in Hogosht-Kamenice. Malaj's ideal gold was Kosovo's Independence that unfortunately was persecuted by barbarians eventually. Malaj, a member of the National Liberation Movement in 1974, precisely along with Adam DEMACI-in and many other members were arrested and sentenced to 9 years imprisonment. Now he is a symbol of freedom and hope, which is strongly appreciated by Albanians today.

Nuhi Berisha 

Nuhi Rexhep Berisha, was born on 3 October 1961, in Sfirca (Kamenice). Berisha had a clear vision for the future of Kosovo and the courage to act against the regime. Nuhi Berisha established the War Party of Kosovo. He was the first spark of war.

Athletes

Soccer players

Xherdan Shaqiri 

Xherdan Shaqiri is a Swiss footballer who plays as a midfielder for FC Bayern Munich football team. He was born on 10 October 1991. As a child Xherdan moved to Switzerland with his family. Shaqiri's youth career began at SV Augst, then he joined FC Basel youth team. At the age of 15 Xherdan was named as the best player of the Under-15 Nike Cup, due to which he came to light in the world of football. Despite the invitations from various famous clubs, Shaqiri decided not to leave Basel. On January the 2nd 2009, Xherdan signed his first professional contract with the Swiss club, and on 2 July the young footballer played his first match against St. Gallen. On 9 November, he scored his first professional goal in a match against Neuchâtel Xamax. Thanks to great performance for Basel, the Swiss was again spotted by notable clubs. In February 2012 he was transferred to Bayern Munich for €11.5 million. Xherdan signed a four-year deal with his new club until 30 June 2016.Ever since his breakthrough into Basel's first team, Shaqiri has drawn widespread praise for his speed, both on and off the ball.
Xherdan Shaqiri has a dual nationality: Swiss and Albanian.

Artan Latifi 

Artan Latifi was born in Gjilan on 5 April 1983. He is a goalkeeper of the famous team KF Drita Gjilan.
Latifi played for well known teams such as: KF Drita, KF Kek, KF Hysi and KF Besiana. He is a Kosovo Albanian professional footballer goalkeeper of KF Drita and Capitan which in 2002–2003 was proclaimed as the champion of the Super League of Kosovo. Latifi was awarded with the Cup with team Hysi and he also won the cup of Kosovo. In 2011, Artan Latifi was announced as sportsmen and the keeper of the year. Also, he received an award from Kosovofootball federation.

Armend Kastrati 

Armend Kastrati was born on 14 February 1985 and he was a player of KF Drita Gjilan, where he had carried captaincy. Kastrati is a professional soccer player born in Gjilan. He is 29 years old. Kastrati is the third Kosovo footballer who plays for Bylis in Albania.
During the passing in Bylis he had said, "I came here with a lot of faith and I hope that it will be so during my entire stay".

Boxers

Liridon Zeqiri 

Liridon zeqiri was declared as the best boxer of the international tournament "Mustafa Hajrulakouq" that took place in Sarajevo, where he showed excellence in the semi-finals and finals. Liridon Zeqiri was announced as the sportsman of the year in the men's competition for the fourth time. In "Bashkim Selishta" gym in Gjilan on 9 April 2011, a match took place where all the audience stood up. This match was being held between Zeqiri and Velky Patrik, and no matter how tough the boxing competition was, Liridon Zeqiri turned out to be the winner. He has also started to win competitions in the world championship for box, which was held in Alamaty in Kazakhstan. He beat all his opponents at every single round.

Agim Latifi 

Agim Latifi, with a Gjilanas citizenship has left an indelible mark in the world of boxing. He started his career as a child, with the aim of ruling and winning any battle in the world of boxing. He was the one with an incredible strength to shock every boxing scene anywhere in the world. From the age of 16 years, all the people noted his incredible talent. In 1980, after he turned 18, he was announced as a champion in the state of box, more specifically in the former-Yugoslavia. During that year, he won his first international medal as runner up in the Balkan tournament that was held in Turkey. In 1986/1987 he was also proclaimed as a champion in Latah of Syria. However, his expulsions out of the gym hit him really hard. He went outside of Kosovo, but he turned back and entered in the Sports federation of Kosovo.
successes:
1980 - Champion of the former Yugoslavia (for youth)
1980 - runner-up in the Balkan Championship in Izmir, Turkey (silver medal)
1982 - Winner of the tournament in Stockholm, Sweden (gold medal)
1983 - Winner of the tournament in Stockholm, Sweden (gold medal)
1985 - Champion of Pristina (team competition)
1986 - runner-up of the former Yugoslavia (silver medal)
1987 - The Balkan Champion in Pristina, Kosovo (Gold)
1987 - Champion of Mediterranean Games in Lataki, Syria (Gold)

Agim Latifi will soon be found in the section of our boxers "Legends" and will always be remembered for his successful achievements.

Karate

Fortesa Orana 

Fortesa Orana is a representative for Kosovo in karate. She is a member of the Elite Karate club from Gjilan, which represents our country in different activities held in many international locations. She has won two golden medals at the Ozawa Cup and one of the bronze medal in the Junior International Open. Contestant from Kosovo, Orana with the golden medal is the biggest success of Kosovo's representative of journey in Qatar. Orana was qualified as the karate sportswoman of 2012 during a ceremony that was organized by the Youth, Culture and Sport, supported by the Mayor, which was declared as the most outstanding one in Gjilan. Fortesa Orana is also announced as the 2012 Sportswoman from FKK (The Karate Federation in Kosovo).

Arts and literature

Actors

Fatmir Spahiu 

Fatmir Spahiu was born in Belgrade in 1981, where he finished his elementary school, and continued at "Zejnel Hajdini" in Gjilan and the Faculty of Arts, Department of Acting, in Prishtina. He is one of the most famous actors of his generation. Until now, he has played in many in various shows in theaters of Kosovo, in many feature films, and has become known in the television series such as "Kafeneja jone". He has also been a speaker of many TV shows. Fatmir Spahiu is married and he has two boys.

Adriana Matoshi 

Adriana Matoshi was born on 5 February 1980 in Gjilan. She finished her primary and secondary school in Gjilan, and later she pursued and completed her studies in Prishtina. She is regarded as one of the most talented actresses in Gjilan. Matoshi is married and has four children. She is awarded with several prices. In Greece, she was awarded as the best actress. In the Italian Festival "FilmLabFestival", she was awarded as the "Best Actress" of the festival. Also, she was honored with the prize "Adriana" from her role in the play "Zija".

Musicians

Naser Berisha 

Naser Berisha at the age of 13 took the first music steps and realized that they should walk him even nowadays, by bringing him joy and happiness. In High School, Berisha along with a classmate and his brother formed the Band-in "Premiera" which contributed to music for about 6 years. He attended a school for Audio-engineer-SAE College in Frankfurt, Germany, where expect the technical part that he learned there, he also had the option to learn about business and market in general. He also utilized the same knowledge, because he worked immediately starting up from the musical side to the side of marketing strategies in order to score a greater success.

Dancer

Writers

Nijazi Ramadani 

Nijazi Ramadani was born in 1964 in Kokaj, Gjilan. 
He finished his first lessons and high school in Gjilan, whereas in the Universiteti i Prishtinës of Pristina he finished Math and Informatics. Ramadani is known as a literary creator, where his literary creativity is mainly focused on the treatment of national motives, respectively the topic of patriotism. This work with his literary creations appeared in the '80's to the local press, where he published poetries in particular. 
During his work, he dealt with all genres of journalistic writings. He is a teacher, coordinator of artists, creators and journalists, Rrjedha, leads edition Rrjedha, where he published a number of works, and edited the magazine Ushtima e maleve, and also he is a member of Kosovo writers Association. 
He lives and still contributes with his career abilities in Gjilan.

Political figures

Lutfi Haziri 

Lutfi Haziri was born in Gjilan on 8 November 1969. He is the Deputy Prime Minister and Minister of Kosovo for Culture, Youth, Sports and Non-Residential Affairs. He headed the delegation of Kosovo in the talks on the political status of Kosovo. Haziri is a central figure in Kosovo politics and a candidate for the successor of the late Kosovo President Ibrahim Rugova for the chairmanship of the Democratic League of Kosovo (LDK). He led the Ministry of Culture, Youth and Sports, from June to October 2010, and was head of the Parliamentary Group of LDK from 2008 to 2010. Currently, he is the chairman of the LDK branch in Gjilan and member of the Parliament of the Republic of Kosovo. Lutfi Haziri is married and has three daughters.

Zenun Pajaziti 

Zenun Pajaziti was born in Gjilan on 12 September 1966. He is Deputy Minister of Labor and Social Welfare in the Government of the Republic of Kosovo. Pajaziti has been selected as the Chairman of the Democratic Party in Gjilan for a 4 year mandate. During the Kosovo war, Pajaziti served the Emergency Committee of Kosovo in Pristina where he was responsible for plenty of issues. From 2005 to 2007 he was a consultant with Public Administration International and a public sector management consultancy group funded by the Department for International Development in UK. Pajaziti is married and has two sons and a daughter.

Faton Bislimi 

Faton Bislimi was born in Gjilan on 12 February 1983. His hometown Gjilan, was the place where he spent his childhood as well. Faton (Tony) Bislimi is a doctoral student of political science at the University of Alberta and the winner of a prestigious 3-year SSHRC Joseph Armand Bombardier-Canada Graduate Scholarship (CGS). In addition, he also won an award at the University of Alberta President's Prize of Distinction in 2012 and 2013. Bislimi completed a master's degree in Public Administration and International Development from the Kennedy School of Government at Harvard University, where he was a Kennedy Fellow, and a master's degree in International Relations from Dalhousie University. He also has served as lecturer at the Victory University College in Prishtina, American University in Kosovo, and at Dalhousie University and Mount Saint Vincent University in Halifax. Faton Bislimi lost his bid as an independent candidate in the 2007 mayoral elections in Gjilan. Bislimi was recently shortlisted to become Kosovo's first ambassador to the United States.

Daut Dauti 
 Daut Dauti (Serbo-Croatian Cyrillic: Даут Даути) (Arabicداوت داوتي). was born in 1960 in Gjilan villages Kokaj . 
 He finished elementary school and secondary school in Pristina , gymnasium, in Gjilan. Has a law degree at the University of Pristina and postgraduate studies of the head on the Thames Valley University of London - the branch of the European Union.  
 First articles published in the New World, then continued to write weekly magazine The Voie, where from 1994 to 1999 he was a correspondent from London.
 Daut Dauti is a journalist and researcher who has worked as adviser to the government of Kosovo on political and social issues. He has been taking a particular interest in the changing religious picture in the area.

Other notable people 
Zoran Antić, footballer
Dragan Dimić, footballer
Mirko Gashi, teacher, journalist, editor
Mira Stupica, actress
Goran Svilanović, politician
Jahi Jahiu, Theater dramaturg

References